Fourknocks Passage Tomb is a passage grave and National Monument located in County Meath, Ireland.

Location

The placename means either "cold hill" or "bare/exposed hill."

History

Fourknocks Passage Tomb dates to 3000–2500 BC.

It was unknown to archaeology until 1949, when a woman making a visit to Newgrange mentioned, "there are mounds like this on my uncle’s farm." It is not marked on any of the old Ordnance Survey maps. It was first excavated in 1950-52 by PJ Hartnett. He found cists, grave goods including a foot bowl and a carved antler pin, urns containing cremated remains and a posthole. Unlike other passage graves, the tomb at Fourknocks is not believed to have been covered over with stones. A wooden pole may have held up a wooden or animal-skin roof.

During reconstruction after excavation, a concrete roof was placed over the chamber for protection.

Description

Fourknocks has a short passage leading into a wide, pear-shaped chamber with three smaller offset chambers. The original roof was likely a wooden structure supported by a central pole.

Two of the lintels have chevron decoration and one of them has lozenge decoration.

Two other mounds in the Fourknocks complex were excavated. One of these likely served as the cremation site for the bones found in the main tomb and was used for later interments.

References

National Monuments in County Meath
Archaeological sites in County Meath
Tombs in the Republic of Ireland